Craugastor matudai (common names: Matuda's robber frog, Matuda's stream frog) is a species of frog in the family Craugastoridae. It is named after Eizi Matuda, Japanese–Mexican botanist who hosted Hobart Muir Smith and his wife Rozella B. Smith, the collectors of the type series from Cerro Ovando.

Description
Males measure  and females  in snout–vent length. The body is heavily rugose with tiny pearly-topped tubercles. The canthus rostralis is sharp with slightly raised edges. The diameter of the tympanum relative to the eye is much larger in males (>4/5)  than in females (little more than 1/2). Males lack vocal sac.

Habitat and conservation
Its natural habitat is pine-oak forest where it lives terrestrially. This rare species is potentially threatened by habitat loss. Mexican law protects it under the "Special Protection" category (Pr).

References

matudai
Amphibians of Guatemala
Amphibians of Mexico
Amphibians described in 1941
Taxa named by Edward Harrison Taylor
Taxonomy articles created by Polbot